Craig Waddell (born 18 January 1995) is a Scottish curler, a . He is from Stirling.

Teams

Men's

Mixed

Mixed doubles

Personal life
Waddell is the grandson of 1979 European champion Jimmy Waddell. His older brother Kyle is also a curler.

References

External links

 

Living people
Scottish male curlers
Scottish curling champions
Curlers from Stirling
1995 births
Sportspeople from Hamilton, South Lanarkshire